Cestraeus is a genus of mullets found in rivers of Asia and Oceania.

Species 
There are currently three recognised species in this genus:
 Cestraeus goldiei (W. J. Macleay, 1883) – goldie river mullet
 Cestraeus oxyrhyncus Valenciennes, 1836 – sharp-nosed river mullet
 Cestraeus plicatilis Valenciennes, 1836 – lobed river mullet

References

External links
 
 

Mugilidae